R4, R04, R.4, R-4, or R/4 may refer to:

Military

Aircraft
 Caudron R.4, World War I French reconnaissance aircraft, first flown in 1915
 Curtiss R-4, air ambulance version of the American Curtiss Model R utility aircraft, first flown in 1915
 Sikorsky R-4, American helicopter, first flown in 1942

Ships
 , Royal Canadian Navy destroyer
 , U.S. Navy submarine

Weapons
 R4 assault rifle, produced by South African manufacturer Vektor
 R4 carbine, assault rifle used by the Philippine Marine Corps
 Bisnovat R-4, Soviet missile

Other military
 Plan R 4, the World War II British plan for an invasion of the neutral state of Norway in April 1940

Science
 R4, designation of risk phrase "Forms very sensitive explosive metallic compounds"
 R4 nuclear reactor, the fourth nuclear reactor built in Sweden
 Exotic R4, in mathematics, a differentiable manifold

Transportation

Cars
 R4, abbreviation for rear-engine, four-wheel drive layout
 R4, a sub-class of Group R rally cars
 Jaguar R4, Jaguar Racing's car for the 2003 Formula One season
 McRae R4, a rally car designed in part by Colin McRae
 Renault R4, alternative name for the Renault 4
 Suzuki GSX-R/4, a concept car made by Suzuki in 2001

Roads
 R4 ring road in Ghent, Belgium
 R4 expressway (Czech Republic)
 R4 expressway (Slovakia)
 R-4 motorway (Spain)
 Radial Road 4 or R-4, an arterial road of Manila, Philippines

Other transportation
 R4 (Canberra), a bus route in Canberra, Australia
 R4 (New York City Subway car)
 R4 (Rodalies de Catalunya), a commuter rail line in Barcelona, Catalonia, Spain
 R4 41st Avenue RapidBus, an express bus service in Vancouver, BC, Canada

Video games
 R4: Ridge Racer Type 4, a racing game for Sony PlayStation, developed by Namco
 Rush Rush Rally Racing, a racing game for Sega Dreamcast, developed by Senile Team
 R4 cartridge, a Nintendo DS flash cartridge

Other uses
 BBC Radio 4 the premier BBC speech radio station
 R4, a building in the Norwegian Government quarter (Norw. Regjeringskvartalet)
 Region 4, the DVD region code for most of Mexico, Central America, South America, Australia, New Zealand, Oceania

See also 
 4R (disambiguation)